The 1972 Monaco Grand Prix was a Formula One motor race held at Monaco on May 14, 1972. It was race 4 of 12 in both the 1972 World Championship of Drivers and the 1972 International Cup for Formula One Manufacturers. The track was substantially modified from 1971, in the interest of safety. The pits were moved to the harbor front, between the chicane and Tabac, and a new chicane was placed near Tabac. Jean-Pierre Beltoise's victory was the only one of his Formula One World Championship career, and the last for BRM.

Qualifying

Qualifying classification

Race

Classification

Championship standings after the race

Drivers' Championship standings

Constructors' Championship standings

Note: Only the top five positions are included for both sets of standings.

References

Monaco Grand Prix
Monaco Grand Prix
Grand Prix